Scantron Corporation is an American company based in Eagan, Minnesota. Scantron provides assessment solutions and technology services for business, education, certification, and government clients.

Scantron Assessment Solutions deals with scanner manufacturing, forms printing, computer-based testing, and the creation of test questions by psychometricians. It operates in 98% of the US school districts, 56 countries, 48 ministries of education, and 94 of the top 100 US universities. The company is well-known for their machine-readable paper forms on which students mark answers to multiple-choice test questions and the optical mark recognition (OMR) and imaging scanners that read them. To analyze those answers, the machines use OMR- and image-based data collection software. In addition to its forms and scanners, Scantron provides web- and desktop-based assessment software, such as Performance Series.

Scantron Technology Solutions provides managed technology support for IT endpoints and devices.  In 2022, Scantron acquired ServRight to further extend its technology capabilities.

Scantron is wholly owned by Transom Capital Group, which took place in December 2019. Scantron was a member of the American Legislative Exchange Council (ALEC) from 2010 until it resigned from the organization in 2012.

See also 
 Mark sense
 Tabulating machine
 Optical mark recognition
 Optical character recognition
 Course evaluation

References

Companies based in Eagan, Minnesota
Optical character recognition
Commercial computer vision systems